Mario Metushev (born 30 March 1979) is a Bulgarian former professional footballer who played as a forward and convicted murderer. He was sentenced to 20 years in prison for the brutal murder of his childhood friend Krasimir Koldzhiev, age 42, on June 15, 2018. The pair was celebrating the popular Muslim festival Bayram in Koldzhiev's house when Metushev committed the murder. It is believed that Metushev suspected that his friend betrayed him to the police for illegally selling tobacco, for which Metushev spent time in custody. The murder was particularly brutal, with Metushev having stabbed the victim, who later died of blood loss, 97 times. Metushev experienced several mental breakdowns during court and in prison. He is believed to have suffered from severe psychological issues in the years leading to the murder. He will be eligible for parole in 2038.

External links
 
https://fakti.bg/krimi/387119-sadat-bivshia-futbolist-mario-metushev-ubil-priatel-s-97-probodni-rani

1979 births
Living people
Bulgarian footballers
First Professional Football League (Bulgaria) players
PFC Pirin Gotse Delchev players
PFC Velbazhd Kyustendil players
Botev Plovdiv players
PFC Cherno More Varna players
FC Chernomorets Burgas players
PFC Beroe Stara Zagora players
PFC Pirin Blagoevgrad players
OFC Bdin Vidin players
Association football forwards
People from Gotse Delchev
Sportspeople from Blagoevgrad Province